The superior auricular ligament crosses from the spine of the helix to the superior margin of the external auditory meatus.

Ear
Ligaments